Cumberland South Riding, an electoral district of the Legislative Assembly in the Australian state of New South Wales was created in 1856 and abolished in 1859.


Election results

Elections in the 1850s

1858

1857 by-election

November 1856 by-election

October 1856 by-election

August 1856 by-election

1856

References

New South Wales state electoral results by district